Josef Humplik (17 August 1888 – 5 April 1958) was an Austrian sculptor. His work was part of the sculpture event in the art competition at the 1936 Summer Olympics.

References

1888 births
1958 deaths
20th-century Austrian sculptors
Austrian male sculptors
Olympic competitors in art competitions
Artists from Vienna
20th-century Austrian male artists